Lysistratus was a Greek sculptor of the 4th century BC, brother of Lysippos. We are told by Pliny the Elder that he followed a strongly realistic line, being the first sculptor to take impressions of human faces in plaster.

References

Pliny the Elder, Naturalis Historiae, 35, 153.

4th-century BC Greek sculptors
Ancient Greek sculptors
Hellenistic sculptors
Ancient Sicyonians